Pseudogygites is an extinct genus of trilobites from the Middle and Upper Ordovician.

Description
The pygidium and the cephalon are about equal in size and shape. The glabella is expanded forward, reaching to the anterior margin. The pygidium contains faint pleural furrows and no axial rings.

Distribution
Pseudogygites is found in late Ordovician oil shales in New York, Ontario, and Southampton Island in the Canadian Arctic. Pseudogygites species are known from exposures of the Billings Shale and Blue Mountain formations.

Species
Four species have been described:
Pseudogygites latimarginata (Hall, 1847)
Pseudogygites hudsoni
Pseudogygites akpatokensis
Pseudogygites arcticus

References

Asaphidae
Asaphida genera
Ordovician trilobites of North America
Middle Ordovician first appearances
Late Ordovician extinctions
Paleozoic life of Ontario
Paleozoic life of the Northwest Territories